Domesticus (Latin for belonging to the house), is found in the binomial or trinomial names of many species or subspecies of animals commonly found in or around the home. Examples include:
 Domesticus (Roman Empire), a member of the Domestici, an elite guard unit of the late Roman Empire
 Agroecius Domesticus, a man of uncertain date who died at the age of 33, and was buried in Vienne
 Secretarius Domesticus, a title in the Secretariat of State of the Holy See
 Silvanus domesticus, a mark of a field in Roman mythology

Species

Bacteria
Olivibacter domesticus

Fungi
Coprinellus domesticus, the firerug inkcap.

Plantae
 Malus domestica, the common apple

Animalia
 Aedes domesticus, a mosquito species in the genus Aedes
 Acheta domesticus, the house cricket
 Anas platyrhynchos domesticus, the domestic duck
 Anser anser domesticus, the common domestic goose
 Anser cygnoides domesticus, the chinese goose
 Bos taurus domesticus, the cattle.
 Canis familiaris domesticus, the domestic dog
 Cryptotermes domesticus, the domestic drywood termite
 Culex domesticus, a mosquito species in the genus Culex
 Dolichopus domesticus, a species of long-legged fly
 Equus caballus domesticus, the domestic horse
 Gallus gallus domesticus, the chicken
 Lycalopex culpaeus domesticus, the fuegian dog
 Meleagris gallopavo domesticus, the domestic turkey
 Mus musculus domesticus, the house mouse
 Oryctolagus cuniculus domesticus, the domestic rabbit
 Passer domesticus, the house sparrow
 Phytoseius domesticus, Rather, 1985, a mite species in the genus Phytoseius and the family Phytoseiidae
 Prodidomus domesticus, Lessert, 1938, a spider species in the genus Prodidomus and the family Prodidomidae found in Congo
 Rattus rattus domesticus, a sub-species of rat
 Sclerodermus domesticus, the hard-skinned cuckoo wasp
 Sus scrofa domesticus, the domestic pig
 Tydeus domesticus, a mite

 Domesticus, the taxonomic term

See also
 Including use as a personal or species name
 Domestica (disambiguation)
 Domesticum (disambiguation)
 Domestication
 Domestikos, a senior military officials of the Byzantine Empire